Susan Ellen Shore is an American audiologist who is the Merle Lawrence Collegiate Professor of Otolaryngology at the University of Michigan. She was elected Fellow of the American Association for the Advancement of Science in 2021.

Early life and education 
Shore was an undergraduate student at the University of the Witwatersrand. She first specialized in pathology and audiology, before starting a master's in hearing science. Her research considers dichotic listening. After completing her doctorate, she joined the Kresge Hearing Research Institute at Louisiana State University. Her doctoral research involved studying how the cochlear responds to frequency-varying signals. After earning her doctorate, Shore joined the University of Pittsburgh as research fellow.

Research and career 
In 2005, Shore joined Michigan Medicine, where she started a research group investigating auditory processing. She was particularly interested in the contributions of multi-sensory systems. Shore identified that certain neurons, which receive input from the face and head, were sensitive to touch. These somatosensory neurons (fusiform cells) send signals to the cochlear nucleus and make it respond to sound. She showed that the somatosensory neurons interact with the nucleus even more acutely after deafness, likely to compensate for the conventional cochlea input. The increase in somatosensory excitations (activity in the fusiform cells) can result in the development of tinnitus. Tinnitus impacts around 15% of Americans. As Chair of the Scientific Advisory Committee of the American Tinnitus Association, Shore called for the United States House of Representatives to supported the Tinnitus Research and Treatment Act.

Shore has investigated synaptic plasticity and the longitudinal nature of these neural changes. She proposed a precise pattern of simulations can be used to reverse this process. This strategy, targeted bimodal auditory-somatosensory stimulation, involved a series of sounds coupled with precisely timed electrical pulses. This combination can launch a process called stimulus-timing dependent plasticity. Specifically, the Auricle (or Michigan Tinnitus Device) looks to reprogram the fusiform cells of the dorsal cochlear nucleus.

Shore was named the Merle Lawrence Collegiate Professor of Otolaryngology Research at the University of Michigan in 2021.

Awards and honors 
2003 Lydia Adams de Witt Award for Women in Science and Engineering
2017 National Institutes of Health Award
2019 STAT Madness
2021 Elected Fellow of the American Association for the Advancement of Science

Selected publications

References 

Year of birth missing (living people)
Living people
University of the Witwatersrand alumni
Audiologists
Louisiana State University alumni
University of Michigan faculty
Fellows of the American Association for the Advancement of Science